Neil Lachlan Watson  (10 December 1905 – 28 April 1990) was a New Zealand politician who served as Mayor of Invercargill from 1962 to 1971.

Early life
Watson was born in Invercargill on 10 December 1905. His father, John Lachlan McGillivray Watson, was a lawyer, and his mother, Laetitia Frances Menzies, was the daughter of superintendent of the Southland Province James Alexander Robertson Menzies. He attended Christ's College, and then studied law at Victoria University College. He was admitted to the bar in 1929 and became a partner in his father's law firm the next year. He married Beverley Mitchel in 1936 and they had a daughter and three sons.

Political career
Watson was first elected to the Invercargill City Council in 1950. He was deputy mayor from 1953 until 1962, when he replaced the retiring Adam Adamson as mayor. He served three terms as mayor, overseeing various improvements to the city, including a new airport and new library. He was appointed an Officer of the Order of the British Empire in the 1970 Queen's Birthday Honours, for services to local government.

Death
Watson died in Rotorua on 29 April 1990, aged 84, and was buried at Invercargill's Eastern Cemetery.

References

1905 births
1990 deaths
20th-century New Zealand lawyers
20th-century New Zealand politicians
Burials at Eastern Cemetery, Invercargill
Deputy mayors of Invercargill
Invercargill City Councillors
Mayors of Invercargill
New Zealand Officers of the Order of the British Empire
New Zealand people of Scottish descent
People educated at Christ's College, Christchurch
Victoria University of Wellington alumni